Ashkum Township is one of twenty-six townships in Iroquois County, Illinois, USA.  As of the 2010 census, its population was 1,542 and it contained 662 housing units.  Ashkum Township formed from portions of Chebanse Township and Onarga Township in March, 1857.

Geography

Cities, towns, villages
 Ashkum

Unincorporated towns
 L'Erable at

Cemeteries
The township contains L'Erable Catholic Cemetery.

Major highways
  Interstate 57
  U.S. Route 45
  U.S. Route 52
  Illinois Route 49
  Illinois Route 116

Demographics

School districts
 Central Community Unit School District 4
 Iroquois West Community Unit School District 10
 Tri Point Community Unit School District 6-J

Political districts
 Illinois' 15th congressional district
 State House District 75
 State House District 105
 State Senate District 38
 State Senate District 53
 Iroquois County Board District 1

References
 
 United States Census Bureau 2007 TIGER/Line Shapefiles
 United States National Atlas

External links
 City-Data.com
 Illinois State Archives

Townships in Iroquois County, Illinois
1857 establishments in Illinois
Populated places established in 1857
Townships in Illinois